Viktor Andriyovych Kuznyetsov (born 17 July 1986 in Zaporizhia) is a Ukrainian long jumper and triple jumper.

Career
As a teenager he won the bronze medal in the triple jump at the 2004 World Junior Championships in a personal best of 16.58 metres. He had 16.84 metres on the indoor track, from February 2004 in Kyiv. He also had 8.12 metres in the long jump, achieved in December 2003 in Brovary. He improved to 8.22 metres in January 2005 in Brovary.

In 2006 he finished fourth in the long jump at the 2006 European Athletics Championships in Gothenburg, with an outdoor personal best of 7.96 meters. He finished seventh in the triple jump at the 2007 European Athletics Indoor Championships with a new personal indoor best of 16.92 meters. In the summer he improved to 16.94 metres, as he won the silver medal at the 2007 Summer Universiade. In 2008 he improved further to 17.16 metres, achieved in June in Yalta.  He competed in the triple jump at the 2008 Olympic Games, finishing eighth.

In 2009 he finally broke the 8-metre barrier outdoors, with an 8.09 metre jump in June in Yalta. He finished eighth in the 2009 European Team Championships Super League meet in Leiria, and competed at the 2009 World Championships without reaching the final. In the 2009–10 indoor season he again jumped better than his outdoor personal best, with 8.11 metres in February 2010 in Sumy.

In summer 2010 he won the gold medal at the 2010 European Team Championships Super League meet in Bergen with an outdoor personal best of 17.26 meters. Then he finished fourth in the triple jump at the 2010 European Athletics Championships in Barcelona, with 17.29 meters,  a personal best by three centimeters.

Achievements

References

External links
 

1986 births
Living people
Sportspeople from Zaporizhzhia
Ukrainian male long jumpers
Ukrainian male triple jumpers
Olympic athletes of Ukraine
Athletes (track and field) at the 2008 Summer Olympics
Athletes (track and field) at the 2012 Summer Olympics
Athletes (track and field) at the 2016 Summer Olympics
Universiade medalists in athletics (track and field)
Universiade gold medalists for Ukraine
Universiade silver medalists for Ukraine
Medalists at the 2013 Summer Universiade
Medalists at the 2007 Summer Universiade
Medalists at the 2011 Summer Universiade
21st-century Ukrainian people